Retanilla is a genus of flowering plants in the family Rhamnaceae, native to Chile, Peru, and Argentina. The species in this genus are actinorhizal plants.

Taxonomy

Species
Retanilla comprises the following species:
 Retanilla ephedra (Vent.) Brongn.
 Retanilla patagonica (Speg.) Tortosa
 Retanilla stricta Hook. & Arn.
 Retanilla trinervia (Gillies & Hook.) Hook. & Arn.

Species names with uncertain taxonomic status
The status of the following species and hybrids is unresolved:
 Retanilla articulata Miers
 Retanilla glauca Phil.
 Retanilla spinifer Gay
 Retanilla spinifera Clos

References

Rhamnaceae
Rhamnaceae genera
Taxa named by Adolphe-Théodore Brongniart
Taxa named by Augustin Pyramus de Candolle